Westville is a town in Holmes County, Florida, United States. As of the 2010 census, the town had a population of 289, up from 221 at the 2000 census. From 2000 to 2010, the Westville town population growth percentage was 30.8%.

Geography

Westville is located in southern Holmes County at  (30.767681, –85.852302), on the west side of the Choctawhatchee River. To the east across the river is the town of Caryville in Washington County.

U.S. Route 90 passes through Westville, leading east through Caryville  to Bonifay, the Holmes County seat, and west  to DeFuniak Springs. Interstate 10 passes through the southern part of the town limits, but the closest access is from Exit 104 in Caryville.

Demographics

As of the census of 2010, there were 289 people, 110 households, and 81 families residing in the town. There were 137 housing units, of which 80.3% were occupied. The racial makeup of the town was 96.5% White, 0.3% Black, and 3.1% from two or more races. Hispanic or Latino of any race were 1.7% of the population.

Of the 110 households in the town, 37.3% had children under the age of 18 living with them, 55.5% were headed by married couples living together, 11.8% had a female householder with no husband present, and 26.4% were non-families. 20.0% of all households were made up of individuals, and 11.8% were someone living alone who was 65 years of age or older. The average household size was 2.63, and the average family size was 3.04.

26.0% of the town's population were under the age of 18, 8.6% were from age 18 to 24, 25.9% were from 25 to 44, 23.5% were from 45 to 64, and 15.9% were 65 years of age or older. The median age was 38.1 years. For every 100 females, there were 92.7 males. For every 100 females age 18 and over, there were 103.8 males.

For the period 2011-15, the estimated median annual income for a household in the town was $34,375, and the median income for a family was $38,750.

Notable people

 Laura Ingalls Wilder, American author
 Almanzo Wilder, husband of Laura Ingalls Wilder
 Rose Wilder Lane, daughter of Laura
 Peter, Laura's cousin; Peter married and stayed in the region

References

Towns in Holmes County, Florida
Towns in Florida
Former county seats in Florida